Metro Tech High School is a high school that forms part of the Phoenix Union High School District in Phoenix, Arizona.

History

The school occupies the site of the former West High School, which closed in 1983. The school opened in 1985 as Metro Tech Vocational Institute. The school received its current name in 1999, as it became a comprehensive high school, transitioning away from its beginnings as a vocational school that focused on only entry-level work skills.

Student population
In the 2017-2018 school year, 1,797 students attended the school. 96.5% of the school's student population are identified as "Hispanic".

Academics
The school's graduation rate in 2017 is 95%, while attendance rate is 94.8%. Students at the school are required to complete one or more of the 20 Career & Technical Education programs that are offered.

Sports
In January 2016, Metro Tech's application for full membership with the Arizona Interscholastic Association was approved by its executive board. From 2016 to 2018, the school's team competes in the 4A Region 2 tier, along with teams at Cactus, Greenway, Moon Valley, Peoria and Sunrise Mountain high schools.

References

External links
 Metro Tech High School

High schools in Phoenix, Arizona
Educational institutions established in 1985
Public high schools in Arizona
1986 establishments in Arizona